Manasunu Maaya Seyake is a bilingual Indian film directed by Suresh P Kumar, starring Sethu, Prince, Disha Pandey and Richa Panai. The Telugu version of the film released in January 2014, while the Tamil version, Manadhil Maayam Seidhai, remains unreleased.

Cast 
 Sethu as Jai
 Prince as Shiva
 Disha Pandey as Lasya
 Richa Panai as Mythili
 Manobala as Sundaram
 Vikram Singh as Rocky

Release
The Telugu version of the film opened to mixed reviews with a critic from The Hindu noting "the plot is good but the director fails to narrate it interestingly", but concluding that it was a "good attempt". Another Telugu film critic noted "a poor first half, lack of entertainment and Tamil flavour spoil the viewing experience."

Soundtrack 

The Soundtrack of the film was composed by Manikanth Kadri, who previously worked few Tamil and Telugu movies. The movie launch was held at Ramanaidu Studios in film nagar, Hyderabad on 27 March 2013.

References

2014 films
2010s Tamil-language films
Indian multilingual films
2010s Telugu-language films
2014 multilingual films